Snook, the alter-ego of Pete Soucy, is a Newfoundland comedian and actor. He is the face of NLClassifieds.com.

Pete Soucy
Peter "Pete" Soucy was born in Stephenville, Newfoundland and Labrador, moved with his family to Gander in 1969, where he attended school before eventually attending NSCAD in Nova Scotia.

Soucy taught High School Visual Arts for five years between 1983 and 1989, four years in Clarenville High School, Clarenville, NL, and one at Bishops College in St. John's.

Since 1986, Soucy has been acting, writing, designing, and directing for stage, radio and television. A graduate of the Nova Scotia College of Art and Design, Soucy later taught Visual Arts for several years in secondary schools. His most successful play, FLUX, has been adapted for television, published, and performed in several provinces and states.

In 1987, Soucy co-founded the Day Job Theatre. Since then he has appeared in many television commercials and has completed a three-year term as Artistic Director of Rebel Island Theatre and the NaGeira Theatre Festival in Carbonear.

Soucy unsuccessfully ran for the Liberals in the 1999 provincial election losing to Jack Harris, who was leader of the NDP at the time.

Soucy subsequently hosted VOCM's Backtalk in St. John's, NL.

Following the resignation of Judy Foote as MP for Bonavista-Burin-Trinity in 2017, Soucy unsuccessfully ran for the Liberal party nomination losing narrowly to Churence Rogers.

Awards
Newfoundland and Labrador Arts Council Award - 1986
Kari Award - 1996

Snook
Snook, Soucy's most popular character has been described as "a street-smart corner boy" and is said to come from St. John's, Newfoundland. He has a recognizable slicked-back hairstyle and is usually seen holding a cigarette. Snook performs at various comedy festivals and venues, hosts television series, and has released several comedy CDs and DVDs. He also appeared in his own segment Stuff about Stuff, on the NTV Evening Newshour.

Appearances

Television
CBC Here and Now - weekly commentaries for three seasons in the 1990s
Wicked Night Out - (Host)
Lorne Elliott's Madly Off in All Directions
CBC Television's Canada Now
Hatching, Matching and Dispatching - 2005 (Voice)
Above and Beyond as Sadler - 2006 (mini-series)
NTV Evening Newshour - weekly commentaries continuing to the present
Jake Thompson's "NL Now" - 2016
"NL Now" Christmas Special - 2017

Also appeared on cbcs son of a critch as the policeman

Film
Rare Birds as Bystander - 2001
Young Triffie as Ranger Jenkins - 2006

Other
Snook is regularly hired to perform at special events, corporate functions, and in ad campaigns. Such as the act of 'Go Healthy' in Newfoundland and Labrador.

Discography

DVDs
Snook's Wicked DVD
Snook's Christmas DVD

CDs
Snook's Christmas (My Gift, Someone Else's Money) (2004)
Snook's Childhood (or Snook ruins a bunch of Kids Songs) (2007)
Another Snook's Christmas (Right Price, Easy to Mail) (2009)

External links
 Snook's website (copy archived April 9, 2018)

References

Canadian male comedians
People from Gander, Newfoundland and Labrador
Living people
NSCAD University alumni
Canadian stand-up comedians
20th-century Canadian comedians
21st-century Canadian comedians
Year of birth missing (living people)
Comedians from Newfoundland and Labrador